The individual dressage was an equestrian event held as part of the Equestrian at the 1912 Summer Olympics programme. It was the first appearance of the event.  The Swedish team dominated the event, taking all three medals and having all six riders place within the top eight.

Results

References

Sources
 
 

Equestrian at the 1912 Summer Olympics